Mahfuz Anam (born 18 June 1950) is a Bangladeshi journalist. He serves as editor and publisher of The Daily Star, one of Bangladesh's largest circulating English-language newspapers. After working in the United Nations for 14 years, Anam co-founded the newspaper with his mentor Syed Mohammad Ali in 1991 during Bangladesh's democratic transition. His criticism of the country's two largest political parties and the military has often resulted in him being sued in court; Anam dismisses the charges as attacks on press freedom. He was elected for a second term as chairman of the Asia News Network in 2022 and 2023.

Anam  is accused by Awami League leader and Bangladesh prime minister Sheikh Hasina of attempting to block funds for her signature Padma Bridge project, a claim which Anam has refuted. The Hasina government briefly suspended government advertisements in The Daily Star, which are a key source of revenue for Anam's newspaper.

Family
Anam was born in 1950 in what was then East Bengal, a province of the Dominion of Pakistan. Anam is the youngest son of Abul Mansur Ahmed, a Bengali lawyer, writer and politician. His father worked and struggled for Muslims in the Bengal Subah (presidency) throughout his lifetime. The situations of Bengali Muslims was very bad at the time. His father was a reputed newspaper editor and political satirist in British India. During the 1950s, his father was vice president of the Awami League between 1953 and 1958, provincial Minister of Education in the United Front cabinet in 1954, and central Minister of Commerce and Industries in the cabinet of Huseyn Shaheed Suhrawardy, the fifth Prime Minister of Pakistan, between 1956 and 1957.

Anam's eldest daughter Tahmima Anam is a Bangladeshi English-language novelist and a recipient of the Commonwealth Writer's Prize. Anam's older brother Mahbub Anam was the editor of The Bangladesh Times and a Member of Parliament from the Bangladesh Nationalist Party (BNP).

Education
Anam studied at Notre Dame College in Dhaka. He holds degrees in economics from the University of Dhaka. Anam won the All Pakistan Debating Championship for three consecutive years in 1967, 1968 and 1969. The debate championships were held in Karachi, Dhaka and Lahore.

1971 Liberation War
In 1971, Anam campaigned for the independence of East Pakistan. He joined the Mukti Bahini in the final months of the Bangladesh Liberation War, and at the end of it was an officer-in-training.

Career
Anam began his career in March 1972. He worked as a staff correspondent of The Bangladesh Observer, the country's main English-language daily at the time. He later served as assistant editor of The Bangladesh Times. He was awarded the Thomas Jefferson Fellowship in Journalism in 1976 by the East-West Center.

Between 1977 and 1990, Anam worked for UNESCO as a media officer and spokesman. He was posted in Paris, New York City and Bangkok. In his last posting in Bangkok, Anam served as UNESCO's Regional Media and Public Affairs Representative. While in Bangkok, Anam planned to set up a newspaper in Bangladesh with Syed Mohammad Ali, the former editor of The Bangkok Post. They secured funding from investors Azimur Rahman, A. S. Mahmud, Latifur Rahman, A. Rouf Chowdhury and Shamsur Rahman. In Anam's words, "The paper was a while in the making. It started in the 80s, with the frantic exchange of letters between S. M. Ali, based in Kuala Lumpur, and myself, based in Bangkok, both working for UNESCO. The plan was that he would retire, in 1988, and I would resign, in 1990, and both of us would return to Bangladesh and launch our paper. The two-year advance presence of Ali Bhai coupled with my frequent visits from Bangkok, sometimes once every month, gave us the chance to finalise investments (with Mahmud Bhai [A S Mahmud], our founding managing director, acting as the catalyst), finalise our plans for the paper, wrap up major recruitments, rent the premises, and most importantly, get the 'declaration'—the official permission to start a newspaper".

The Daily Star was founded during Bangladesh's transition to parliamentary democracy in 1991. The period coincided with economic liberalization reforms. The newspaper quickly gained popularity in the capital Dhaka and the port city of Chittagong. It became the largest circulating English-language daily in the country, out-beating rivals like The Bangladesh Observer and Holiday. Its editorial views became highly influential. It emerged as a symbol of Bangladesh's outspoken, diverse and privately owned press which flourished between 1990 and the late 2000s. According to the BBC, "The Daily Star is the most popular English-language newspaper in Bangladesh. It was launched as Bangladesh returned to parliamentary democracy a quarter of a century ago, and has always had a reputation for journalistic integrity and liberal and progressive views – a kind of Bangladeshi New York Times". After S. M. Ali's death in 1993, Anam began leading the journalistic operations of the newspaper. The newspaper's parent company Mediaworld Ltd appointed Anam as publisher in 1998. Anam worked closely with Syed Fahim Munaim, who was the newspaper's Managing Editor and responsible for revenue matters.

Anam is the founding president of the Newspapers Owners Association of Bangladesh (NOAB). He also served as Secretary-General of the Editors Council of Bangladesh. Anam was elected chairman of the Asia News Network (ANN) in Seoul in 2007. Anam is a member of the Board of Trustees of the Bangladeshi chapter of Transparency International (TIB).

Anam worked with the Ford Foundation and Professor Rehman Sobhan to establish the Bangladesh Freedom Foundation.

Views
Anam has been described as a libertarian. His influential editorials cover sensitive issues of Bangladesh's turbulent politics and democracy. Anam became a fierce critic of both Sheikh Hasina and Khaleda Zia on issues like parliament boycotts, corruption and human rights abuses. Anam's economic views are pro-free market. In foreign policy, Anam supports improving relations with India. In 2010, Anam delivered a keynote speech on "Why China should be interested in Bangladesh?", which discussed Bangladesh's economic growth and trade relations with Beijing.

During the 2006–2008 Bangladeshi political crisis, Anam openly criticized the army chief despite restrictions on press freedom under a state of emergency. In response to General Moeen U Ahmed's suggestions for a Bangladeshi brand of democracy, Anam wrote "On the questions of the Chief of Army Staff's idea of 'having our own brand of democracy' we want to point out that our first brush with a General in politics was with Ayub Khan back in 1958 and he wanted to 'reinvent democracy according to the genius of the people' and we ended up having 'basic democracy' that was thoroughly rejected by our people, though it took a while. Much later in Pakistan came General Zia-ul-Huq who also wanted to redefine democracy. His was quite a clever ploy and very original. In order to deprive the Pakistanis of exercising their right to elect a government Zia said 'I cannot accept democracy where sovereignty belongs to the people. In my book sovereignty only belongs to Allah'. So Zia-ul-Huq ran Pakistan under his personal fiat, as accepting the sovereignty of the people was against his belief. Ask any Pakistani for the great and irreparable damage he had caused to their country". Indian columnist Kuldip Nayar referred to Anam's piece in Outlook regarding Ayub Khan's views on the "genius of the people". Anam's article was written amid fears of a direct military takeover in Bangladesh; the army chief later ruled out any possibility of grabbing power.

One of Anam's most influential articles was "This is no way to strengthen democracy", which he wrote in response to Sheikh Hasina's detention by the military-backed caretaker government in 2007. In the article, he stated "We trust the chief of staff when he says that the Army is not involved in politics or forming any new party. But what do we do when we receive reports from our correspondents that district administrators are making lists of so-called clean politicians and that many of them are being visited by the powers that be goading them to join the new so-called king's party? What do we do when senior leaders of both the BNP and the AL tell us of powerful visitors asking them to move against their party leaders or face corruption charges? We would like to strongly suggest that this is no way to strengthen democracy. Just as 'command economy' failed so will 'command politics'. The core of democracy is people's right to choose their leaders and those who will represent them in the government".

Anam protested the closure of a pro-opposition newspaper in 2010 by referring to Voltaire. In 2021, Anam took a neutral stand over the controversy surrounding the Al Jazeera documentary All the Prime Minister's Men. Censorship in Bangladesh meant there was little coverage of the scandalous accusations in the documentary. Anam called it "not a top-class work of investigative journalism". Anam also wrote a column openly addressed to the army chief General Aziz Ahmed. Anam blasted General Ahmed who suggested that criticizing the army chief was tantamount to criticizing the Prime Minister.

Anam is traditionally seen as a defender of the values of secular democracy which inspired Bangladesh's independence movement. There has been speculation about Anam's political ambitions. Anam was involved in creating a citizens' platform with Nobel laureate Muhammad Yunus. Yunus tried to form a political party called Nagorik Shakti (Citizen Power).

Despite earlier libertarian views, Anam appeared to cautiously welcome the Fall of Kabul in 2021 and the Taliban takeover of Afghanistan. He described the situation as a defeat for the United States.  In spite of Hasina accusing Anam of colluding with the World Bank to stop the Padma Bridge project, Anam called the completion of the bridge's construction Sheikh Hasina's "finest hour". At the same time, his newspaper has faced pressure from the Bangladesh government and intelligence agencies. Anam's newspaper suffered a short lived drop in revenue due to the Hasina administration withholding adverts from government departments. The government then lifted the ban and resumed adverts in The Daily Star and its sister publication Prothom Alo. Anam's newspaper now has to work within the confines of censorship due to the widely criticized Digital Security Act, which many Bangladeshi journalists want repealed.

Lawsuits
During the government of Khaleda Zia in the 2000s, Anam faced defamation lawsuits from ruling BNP leaders. He was co-accused with Matiur Rahman, editor of the Bengali newspaper Prothom Alo. Anam's lawyer was Kamal Hossain. Anam was also found to be in contempt of court for reporting that a recently appointed judge had falsified his academic credentials; the court action had been filed by the judge's father. Under the Awami League government of Sheikh Hasina since 2009, Anam has faced 83 lawsuits, including 30 counts of criminal defamation.

The lawsuits against Anam were criticized by PEN America.

Criticism
Sheikh Hasina's son Sajeeb Wazed calls Anam "completely unethical" and "a liar". David Bergman, a former employee of The Daily Star, is also critical of Anam for his views on the Padma Bridge graft scandal. In 2016, speaking at a panel discussion on ATN News, Anam conceded that reports published in The Daily Star in 2007 alleging corruption by Prime Minister Sheikh Hasina were based on uncorroborated leaks fed by the military's Directorate General of Forces Intelligence. "It was a big mistake," he said during the interview and stated that "It was a bad editorial judgement, I admit it without any doubt". Despite his admission, he has been facing concerted attacks from the government and Awami League supporters. As of 18 February 2016, 79 cases have been filed against him including 17 sedition and 62 defamation cases.

Awards
Courageous Journalism Award, 2016 – East-West Center

References

Bangladeshi journalists
Living people
1950 births
University of Dhaka alumni
Bangladeshi newspaper editors
Honorary Fellows of Bangla Academy
Notre Dame College, Dhaka alumni
20th-century Bengalis
21st-century Bengalis
People from Mymensingh District
St. Gregory's High School and College alumni